Thermonotus cylindricus is a species of beetle in the family Cerambycidae. It was described by Per Olof Christopher Aurivillius in 1911. It is known from Malaysia and Borneo.

References

Lamiini
Beetles described in 1911